John Cash may refer to:

Johnny Cash (1932–2003), singer
John R. Cash (album), a 1975 album by Johnny Cash
John Cash (physician) (1936–2020), former president of the Royal College of Physicians of Edinburgh
John Theodore Cash (1854–1936), British physician, professor of Materia Medica, Aberdeen University
John Carter Cash (born 1970), American country musician and son of Johnny Cash
John Cash (American football) (born 1934), American football player

Cash, John